Hans-Jürgen Bernard Theodor von Arnim (4 April 1889 – 1 September 1962) was a German general in the Nazi Wehrmacht during World War II who commanded several armies. He was a recipient of the Knight's Cross of the Iron Cross.

Early life
Hans-Jürgen Bernhard Theodor von Arnim was born in the town of Ernsdorf in Prussian Silesia on April 4th 1889. His father, Hans von Arnim (1861–1931) was a General in the German Army and Jürgen would follow in his father's footsteps and join the army in 1907. During the First World War he fought on both the Western and Eastern fronts and after the war, he remained in the Reichswehr.

World War II 
When Hitler and the Nazis come to power in 1933 Von Arnim was still in the Reichswehr and continued to serve in the Wehrmacht as a major general. Arnim commanded the 52nd Infantry Division in both the Battles for Poland and France. In October 1940, Arnim was given command of the 17th Panzer Division.

Von Arnim took part in Operation Barbarossa, the invasion of the Soviet Union, and on 1 October 1941, took command of XXXIX Panzer Corps until November 1942.

On 20 February 1943 he was appointed commander of the 5th Panzer Army under Erwin Rommel in North Africa, whom he replaced  as commander of the Army Group Africa on the 10th March 1943. He surrendered to British forces on 12 May 1943 as a consequence of the successful allied Operation Strike.

His surrender to the British was a part of Spike Milligan's Monty:  His Part in My Victory where he was misnamed (whether by accident or on purpose as Milligan eventually used to rename a lot of the characters within his Memoirs so that they or their relations would not be embarrassed by their activities) as Von Arnheim where Major Chater-Jack makes the announcement of the German defeat stating that "It's over!  General Von Arnheim (sic) has surrendered and he is very angry."

Von Arnim was sent to Britain where he was held and interrogated (as well as bugged) at both Latimer House and Trent Park. He was then interned along with 24 other German general officers at Camp Clinton, Mississippi, and was released on 1 July 1947. 

He died in 1962 in Bad Wildungen, West Germany.

Mistreatment of Jews in Tunisia
The Jewish population of Tunisia was used for forced labour by Arnim to prepare defences against Allied attacks, and the Jewish community was ruthlessly plundered for gold.

Promotions
Fahnenjunker-Gefreiter (25 May 1908)
Fahnenjunker-Unteroffizier (18 July 1908)
Fähnrich (19 November 1908)
Leutnant (19 August 1909)
Oberleutnant (27 January 1915)
Hauptmann (27 January 1917)
Major (1 April 1928)
Oberstleutnant (1 April 1932)
Oberst (1 July 1934)
Generalmajor (1 January 1938)
Generalleutnant (1 December 1939)
General der Panzertruppe (17 December 1941)
Generaloberst (4 December 1942)

Awards
 Iron Cross (1914) 2nd Class (16 September 1914) & 1st Class (2 November 1914) 
 Knight's Cross of the Royal House Order of Hohenzollern with Swords (7 September 1918)
 Wound Badge in Silver (6 August 1918)
 Hanseatic Cross Hamburg Version
 Honour Cross of the World War 1914/1918 (15 November 1934)
 Wehrmacht Long Service Award 1st to 4th Class (2 October 1936)
 Knight's Cross of the Iron Cross on 4 September 1941 as commander of the 17th Panzer Division

References

Citations

Bibliography

 
 
 

1889 births
1962 deaths
German Army personnel of World War I
Colonel generals of the German Army (Wehrmacht)
Hans-Jurgen
Recipients of the Knight's Cross of the Iron Cross
People from Dzierżoniów
Nazi war criminals
German prisoners of war in World War II held by the United States